Siemienice  is a small village in the administrative district of Gmina Krzyżanów, within Kutno County, Łódź Voivodeship, in central Poland.

Time zone
Europe/Warsaw UTC+1 (DST +01:00)

Elevation
96 m (315 ft)

References

Siemienice